Sanam may refer to:

Places
 Sanam, Iran, a village in Iran
 Sanam, Niger, a commune in Niger
 Sanam, Sudan, a village in Sudan

Entertainment

 Sanam (1997 film), a 1997 Hindi drama film
 Sanam (1951 film), a 1951 Bollywood romantic film
 Sanam (TV series), 2016 Pakistani TV series 
 Sanam (dance), music and dance of the Uyghur people
 Sanam (band), Indian band

People
 Sanam Baloch (born 1986), Pakistani television actress
 Sanam Jung, Pakistani television actress
 Sanam Marvi (born 1986), Pakistani singer
 Sanam Puri, Indian singer
 Sanam Saeed, Pakistani film and television actress
 Sanam Chaudhry, Pakistani actress

Other uses
 Sanam (yacht), a 2015 super-yacht
Southern Azerbaijan National Awakening Movement
 Sanam Tehran Sports Club